Ouled Ali Hammam is a place located at  in Guelma Province Algeria south of Bouati Mahmoud.

The topography is  hill country covered in shrubs, and the area is approximately 416 meters above Sea level

Since Roman times the town has been renown for its thermal springs, hence the name: The term "hammam" is translated as "Turkish bath.

Nearby towns include Djebel Bou Chahrene and Koudiet Mrâh el Ba’dj. Héliopolis, Algeria is twenty kilometers to the south.

The temperature ranges from 5 °C to around 35°c in Summer and rainfall is concentrated in winter with summers being dry.

References

Communes of Guelma Province